Fateh Ezatpoor (or Ezzatpour  Persian: فاتح عزت پور), son of Ahmad, born in 1958, is a calligraphist, illuminated manuscript artist, university professor, and researcher.

Education
He is from the Jorabad quarter located in the city of Sanandaj and holds a bachelor's degree from Allameh Tabatabai University. Mr. Ezatpoor is the official instructor of Iranian Calligraphists Association in Tehran and Sanandaj. Since 1982, he has been teaching calligraphy; in addition, he has taught this art at other Artistic and Cultural Centers; from the early years of primary education in 1969, he became acquainted with the art of calligraphy. In his household, he practiced penmanship in company with his uncle, Mehdi Kamali Kurdistani, and in 1978, he went to Tehran to continue his academic studies.

Simultaneous with his education in Tehran, he did not lose his sight on practicing penmanship. In that very year, he became acquainted with the organization of Iranian Calligraphists Association; after enrolment in the presence of Prof. Abbas Akhavein (عباس اخوین), he started to acquire this art, and in 1982 he managed to receive his certificate of calligraphy with distinction from the Iranian Calligraphists Association.

After receiving his certificate of calligraphy from Iranian Calligraphists Association in Tehran, he was singled out as the official instructor and officially started to teach calligraphy. Many art learners were taught by him in various courses of the association and so far, a great number of his students have managed to receive a certificate of calligraphy with distinction from the Iranian Calligraphists Association.

Early life 
In the early days of 1969, Mr. Ezatpoor started to learn basic Nastaliq calligraphy from his uncle Mehdi Kamali Kurdistani which was his first mentor and teacher to learn Persian Calligraphy. Mr. Kamali was living in Sanandaj and was an acclaimed calligraphist at that time.

Later on, when living in Tehran, he gets the chance of being taught by Mr. Abbas Akhavein (عباس اخوین) from 1979 who is one of the best Calligraphy professors in the nation. While Mr. Ezatpoor had an outstanding performance in Nastaliq script he got interested into Shekaste script ("broken" cursive calligraphy) and from 1980 he started to learn Shekaste from Yadollah Kaboli Khansari (یدالله کابلی) in Iranian Calligraphists Association.

In addition to that, Mr. Ezatpoor's exceptional illustration skills come from Biok Ahmari from 1983. Biok Ahmari (also بیوک احمری) was one of the best illuminators at the time and his illuminations have been recognized internationally. Mr. Ezatpoor spent few years learning This (Illumination that goes around the calligraphy artworks) from Mr. Ahmari which gave him an outstanding performance to illustrate his own artworks.

Later in his artistic career, Mr. Ezatpoor continued to transfer this invaluable experience to hundreds of his students that many of them are currently professors in the field of Nastaliq and Shekaste scripts as well as Taz-hib. It worth mentioning that currently, the former students are illustrating Mr. Ezatpoor's artworks periodically.

Artistic and scientific degrees received 
On 2009, Mr. Ezatpoor was one of the first artists in Iran that received the Certificate of Grade I (equal to Doctoral Honorary Degree) recognized by the Ministry of Sciences, Researchers and Technology for his outstanding artistic work and experience. He also holds Certificate of Mastership from Iranian Calligraphists Association as well as his BS in Economic Sciences from Allameh Tabataba'i University.

Individual and group exhibitions 
Mr. Ezatpoor has served in multiple events as an international/national judge as well as several other exhibitions throughout his career. He was the international judge/mentor for the Calligraphy Contest conducted in Georgian National Center of Manuscripts on 2012, been a part of all annual World of Islam international exhibitions on professor's exhibitions, and being a judge for all Bi-Annual Persian Calligraphy conferences. Mr. Ezatpoor's mentorship events and exhibitions have been throughout the region including Georgia (country), Iraqi Kurdistan, and throughout the country such as Tehran (Reza Abbasi Museum, Art Gallery, Saba Gallery), Isfahan, Qeshm, and Sanandaj that adds up to over 250+ exhibitions, workshops, and events.

List of works published and calligraphic activities 
Ezatpoor has published more than 14 books and some have been republished for more than 40 times. Here is a list of published works:

Writer
During his artistic activities, Ezatpoor has prepared and published many articles and educational pamphlets to be used by the interested people and each of them has had a valuable role in the promotion of this art.

In addition to artistic activities, he has been the member of Research Experts in the field of housing in Iran as well; so far he has presented and published more than forty articles in scientific journals and seminars held by the Ministry of Housing and Urban Development; in this connection, and in order  not to  prolong this piece of writing, only a part of the records of this dear instructor are pointed out.

Artistic professions 
 Professor of Iranian Calligraphists Association from 1982
 Professor in Artistic and Scientific fields including teaching at Islamic Azad University, University of Applied Sciences and Technology, and the Center for Public Administration from 1989
 Nationwide Referee in the field of Calligraphy, and member of the council for diagnosis and revising examination papers at Iranian Calligraphists Association from 1983.
 Teaching at Reza Abbasi Museum and Khayam Library located in Park Khayam, Tehran
 Teaching at Artistic Centers for private institutes in Tehran and Sanandaj.
 Referee of provincial competitions including students competitions, and Calligraphy Exhibitions of the provincial universities and Technical and vocational high schools. etc.
 Instructing fine penmanship at Calligraphy Classes and Teaching the civil servants employees.
 Founder and Instructor at His Artistic Work Office (Ezatpoor Art Association)

References

Living people
Iranian calligraphers
1958 births